Ras Rakan is the northernmost point in the Qatari Peninsula, located in Al Shamal. It is the north-western point of an islet called Jazirat Ras Rakan, but as the channel between this islet and the mainland is not passable for boats, Jazirat Ras Rakan may be regarded as forming the northern extremity of the promontory.

Location
The islet is nearly 1 ½ miles from the shore, and may be reached by wading through low water. The northernmost town of Qatar, Ar Ru'ays, lies 2 ½ miles south-east from the islet. If approached at from a northward direction, Ar Ru'ays becomes visible before Ras Rakan is spotted.

Description
Jazirat Ras Rakkan is a very low, T-shaped islet, with tufts of grass on it. There are some small mangroves on the southern side of it. It is nearly 2 miles in length east to west, and extremely narrow. The T-head, at its western end, is 1 mile long.

Hydrology
Furthermore, the waters had a salinity of 48.18 psu, an average temperature of 19.61°C and 4.86 mg/L of dissolved oxygen.

References

Al Shamal
Geography of Qatar
Islands of Qatar